Gray Line or Grey Line may refer to:

Transportation
 Grey Line (Bangkok), a planned monorail line in Bangkok, Thailand
 Grey Line (Delhi Metro), Delhi, India
 Gray Coach, a former Canadian inter-city bus line based in Toronto
 E Embarcadero, San Francisco, California
 Jubilee line, London, England
 Line 6 Finch West, Toronto, Canada
 Line 9 (Shenzhen Metro), Shenzhen, China
 Metro (Minnesota), lettered lines are color-coded "METRO Gray", Minneapolis—Saint Paul, Minnesota
 Olympic Park railway line, Sydney, Australia
 Pujiang line, Shanghai, China
 Serpukhovsko-Timiryazevskaya line, known as the Grey Line, Moscow, Russia

New York City Subway
BMT Canarsie Line
L (New York City Subway service)
S (New York City Subway service), three separate rapid transit subway shuttles

Other uses
 Gray Line Worldwide, an international sightseeing operator
 Grayline lascar
 Terminator (solar) or grey line, delimiting the illuminated and dark sides of a planetary body

See also 
 Silver Line (disambiguation)
 White Line (disambiguation)